Italo Casali (2 July 1940 – 2019) was a Sammarinese sports shooter. He competed at the 1972 Summer Olympics and the 1976 Summer Olympics. He died in 2019 at the age of 78.

References

1940 births
2019 deaths
Sammarinese male sport shooters
Olympic shooters of San Marino
Shooters at the 1972 Summer Olympics
Shooters at the 1976 Summer Olympics
Place of birth missing